Open Goal Broomhill Football Club is a Scottish football club playing its home matches at Broadwood Stadium in Cumbernauld, North Lanarkshire. They are members of the Scottish Lowland Football League, in the fifth tier of the Scottish football league system. The club was formed in 2014 as BSC Glasgow, a senior team associated with Broomhill Sports Club, a youth sports organisation based in the Broomhill area of Glasgow, and were elected to the Lowland League for the 2014–15 season. They originally shared with Maryhill F.C. at their Lochburn Park ground before relocating to Alloa in 2016. In 2021, the senior team split from Broomhill Sports Club, who launched a new BSC Glasgow team in the development division of the West of Scotland Football League, with the senior team being renamed Broomhill F.C. and retaining the Lowland League place. From the 2022–23 season, the team is known as Open Goal Broomhill as a result of a partnership with football media brand Open Goal, with former professional footballer and podcast host Simon Ferry becoming the team's manager.

History
Broomhill Sports Club was founded in Broomhill, Glasgow, in June 2004 as a multi-sports club for local children. By 2014 the club had grown to cater for 700 children in various sports, but primarily football.

BSC Glasgow F.C. was launched in 2014 as a senior football team to provide a pathway into adult football for players from the youth teams. The club successfully applied to join the Scottish Lowland Football League for the 2014–15 season, and won the SFA South Region Challenge Cup in their first season.

From there BSC have gone on to reach the Lowland League Cup Final in 2016–17 and the South Challenge Cup final in 2017–18 before taking home the Lowland League Cup trophy in 2018–19. BSC Glasgow's improving fortunes in the Scottish Lowland Football League coincided with the arrival of manager Stephen Swift, claiming a third-place finish in 2017–18 and a runners up place in 2018–19.

On 1 July 2021, the club officially announced its separation from BSC Glasgow and changed its name to Broomhill Football Club, retaining their membership of the Scottish Lowland League and Scottish Football Association while BSC Glasgow entered a new entity, an amateur team in the Development section of the West of Scotland Football League.

In May 2022, the club announced a partnership with football media brand Open Goal, beginning from the 2022–23 season. The team rebranded as Open Goal Broomhill, with professional footballer and Open Goal podcast host Simon Ferry becoming the team's manager. It is intended that there will be club-related content across Open Goal's platform, including a monthly fly-on-the-wall documentary.

Ground
From the 2016–17 season, the club reached an agreement with Scottish League One side Alloa Athletic to share Recreation Park, with a view to the club reaching their long-term goal of having their own facility located in Glasgow. The club previously ground-shared with Maryhill at Lochburn Park for their first two seasons in the Lowland League.

As of the 2022–23 season, the club will play their home games at Broadwood Stadium, Cumbernauld.

Current squad
As of 12 January 2023

On loan

Coaching staff

Season-by-season records 

† Season curtailed due to coronavirus pandemic - At the end of the 2019–20 season, BSC claimed 3rd spot over East Stirlingshire due to points per game average.

Honours
Lowland Football League
Runners-up: 2018–19
SFA South Region Challenge Cup
Winners: 2014–15
Runners-up: 2017–18, 2019–20
 Lowland League Cup
Winners: 2018–19
 Runners-up: 2016–17

References

External links
Official website

Football clubs in Scotland
Football clubs in Glasgow
Association football clubs established in 2014
Lowland Football League teams
2014 establishments in Scotland
Football in Clackmannanshire
Maryhill
 
Alloa
Cumbernauld
Football in North Lanarkshire